Sergio D'Autilia  (born 20 August 1977) is an Italian former professional footballer who played as a forward. He made his fully professional club debut for Inter Milan in the 1996–97 Coppa Italia on 6 November 1996 against Cagliari. While he never played a league match with Inter, he had 19 appearances on the bench during the 1996–97 Inter Milan season and also in the second leg of the 1997 UEFA Cup Final against FC Schalke 04.

In 2014, he joined lower-league side Brera.

References

1977 births
Living people
Italian footballers
Association football midfielders
Inter Milan players